Eberhard Wächter (28 February 1762 – 14 August 1852) was a German painter. Wächter was born in Balingen and died in Stuttgart.

Life and career
He studied painting at Paris under Jean-Baptiste Regnault, Jacques-Louis David, and Antoine-Jean, Baron Gros, and later went to Rome, where he improved his French classical style of painting by the study of Italian art. He appreciated Carsten's freer style with its sterling merit, and adopted the ideas of the Romantic school. While at Rome he became a Catholic.

He gained great influence over his contemporaries by his fine perception of the depths of feeling that could be evoked from the subjects he used. To this period of his best work belong a "Child Jesus on the Lamb", "Belisarius at the Porta Pinciana at Rome", and "Job and His Friends". In 1798 the French drove him from Rome, and he went to Vienna, as he found no place in his native town of Stuttgart, on account of his conversion. At Vienna he illustrated books and made drawings, many of which were etched or engraved by Rahl and Leybold. While there he also painted a "Mater dolorosa", a "Caritas", and "Criton visiting Socrates in Prison".

Wachter was a founder of the Brotherhood of St. Luke, a society of those painters who soon after established at Rome a more natural and thoughtful school of painting, known as the Nazarenes. Wachter finally went to Stuttgart, where he painted "Cimon in Prison", "Ulysses and the Sirens", the "Boat of Life", "Andromache standing at the Urn with Hector's Ashes", the "Greek Muse mourning over the Ruins of Athens", a "Virgin with St. John Sorrowing at the Grave of Christ", etc. He excelled in treating lyrical and elegiac subjects.

Honours

1831 Eberhard von Wachter was awarded as Knight of the Order of the Crown (Württemberg), which was associated with the personal title of nobility.
The city of Stuttgart named 1873 Wächterstraße and 1902 the guards squadron after him.

Literature

 August Wintterlin: "Wächter, Georg Friedrich Eberhard". In: Allgemeine Deutsche Biographie (ADB). Volume 40, Duncker & Humblot, Leipzig 1896, pp 431–434.
 Walther Killy, Rudolf Vierhaus (ed.): German Biographical Encyclopedia. Volume 10. KG Saur Verlag GmbH & Co. KG, Munich 1996, p. 271.
 Brockhaus Encyclopedia, 21st edition, Volume 29 Bibliographical Institute & FA Brockhaus, Mannheim 2006  , p. 303.
 Werner Gebhardt: Die Schüler der Hohen Karlsschule. Ein biographisches Lexikon. Kohlhammer Verlag, Stuttgart 2011 , p. 540. (in German; a biographical dictionary.)

Sources
 http://runeberg.org/nfcl/0684.html, Nordisk familjebok (Second Edition, 1921)

References

1762 births
1852 deaths
German romantic painters
German Roman Catholics
Pupils of Jacques-Louis David
Pupils of Antoine-Jean Gros
Nazarene painters
Converts to Roman Catholicism from Protestantism